Patrick Durcan (born 1951) is an Irish District Court judge and a former Fine Gael politician.

Durcan was born in Westport, County Mayo in 1951, and was educated at University College Dublin. He worked as a solicitor from 1973 and sat as a member of Mayo County Council from 1979 to 2004, and also as a member of Westport town council. Durcan stood for Dáil Éireann as the running mate of future Taoiseach Enda Kenny in Mayo West at the 1981, February 1982, November 1982 and 1987 general elections, but was unsuccessful on each occasion. He served as a Senator in Seanad Éireann from 1982 to 1987. Durcan was nominated by Taoiseach Garret FitzGerald. He was appointed a district judge in November 2011.

References

1951 births
Living people
Alumni of University College Dublin
Fine Gael senators
District Court (Ireland) judges
Members of the 17th Seanad
Politicians from County Mayo
Nominated members of Seanad Éireann